Ajao is a settlement in Kenya.

Ajao or AJAO may also refer to:

 Muisi Ajao (born 1978), Nigerian footballer
 Adrian Russell Ajao (1964–2017), perpetrator of the 2017 Westminster attack
 Juvenile Arthritis Organization (AJAO), a membership group of the Arthritis Foundation